Slim Mhadhebi (born 21 April 1994) is a Tunisian football midfielder.

References

1994 births
Living people
Tunisian footballers
AS Kasserine players
ES Zarzis players
AS Gabès players
Olympique Béja players
ES Métlaoui players
JS Kairouan players
Association football midfielders
Tunisian Ligue Professionnelle 1 players